Sara Pérez Romero (July 19, 1870 - July 31, 1952), also known as Sara Pérez de Madero, was a Mexican politician and activist. She was married to Francisco I. Madero, the 37th President of Mexico. Pérez Romero was also known as the "First Lady of the Revolution" or by her nickname, Sarita.

Early life
Sara Pérez Romero was born on June 19, 1870, in San Juan del Río, Querétaro. She was one of the daughters born to Avelina Romero and the landowner Macario Pérez Romero. She suffered the loss of her mother at a young age. Sara passed the first years of her childhood and adolescence in Aculco and Arroyo Zarco. To continue her studies, she traveled to Mexico City. At the beginning of 1893, she was sent to the College of Notre Dame in San Francisco, California, where she met Mercedes Madero and Magdalena Madero.

Marriage and personal life
Pérez Romero started dating Francisco I. Madero in 1897. They signed a marriage contract in 1903; this was a civil ceremony celebrated on January 26 in the capital. On the 27th, they held the religious ceremony in the chapel of the archbishop's palace on the second street of Santo Domingo. The wedding was conducted by the archbishop Próspero María y Alarcón y Sánchez de la Barquera. Guests dined in the Reform Hotel. The couple made their home in San Pedro de las Colonias in the state of Coahuila. Pérez Romero did not have children.

In 1909, when Madero was jailed in Monterrey, Pérez Romero lived with him in prison. However, when Madero was transferred to San Luis Potosí, she was forced to rent a house near the penitentiary because they did not let her be with her husband. Pérez Romero saw him whenever she could; also, together with the potosino Pedro Antonio de los Santos, she raised a bail of ten thousand pesos so Madero could go free.

When the Mexican Revolution began, Pérez Romero accompanied her husband on his presidential campaign. She accompanied him to all areas, both to soldiers' camps and party conferences, both to speeches and talks.

Presidency of Francisco I. Madero
Being the first lady, Pérez Romero rallied the troops, organized proselytizing acts, held festivals in favor of the victims of the armed movement, assisted at workers' meetings, and received the organizers of women's political clubs (such as the Hijas de Cuauhtemoc), and attended committees. Pérez Romero and her husband were the bridesmaid and best man for the wedding of Emiliano Zapata and Josefa Espejo in 1911.

Coup and later life

In February 1913, there was a coup against President Madero. This episode, known as the Ten Tragic Days, ended with the apprehension and assassination of President Madero, of Vice President José María Pino Suárez, and of various maderist politicians. Upon the death of her husband, Pérez Romero was exiled to Cuba, where she was taken in by the ambassador Manuel Márquez Sterling. She then lived in the United States, and in 1921 she returned to Mexico City. Once in the city, she lived in a house on Zacatecas in the Colonia Roma neighborhood. She remained there until her death, living off a government pension.

Interview
In 1916, three years after the Ten Tragic Days, the American journalist Robert Hammond Murray interviewed Sara Pérez Romero. In the interview, she related how, during the imprisonment of the president and vice president, she went to seek help from the U.S. ambassador Henry Lane Wilson. She asked him to protect them, and he rejected her petition.

Death
Sara Pérez Romero died in her home on July 31, 1952, 39 years after Madero's assassination. The press labeled her "The First Lady of the Revolution." She was laid to rest in the Panteón Francés in Mexico City on August 1, 1952, in the same tomb where her husband was barried. Her coffin was covered with the flag of the White Cross, which she funded together with Elena Arizmendi in 1911. Upon the flag were the words "" ("for humanity").

Five of Madero's brothers and many of his relatives assisted with the burial. Also present were the former presidents Pascual Ortiz Rubio, Roque González Garza, and the incumbent at the time, Miguel Alemán Valdés.

References

First ladies of Mexico
1870 births
1952 deaths
People of the Mexican Revolution
People from San Juan del Río